Al Abbas is a Syrian town located in Abu Kamal District, Deir ez-Zor. According to the Syria Central Bureau of Statistics (CBS), Al Abbas had a population of 2,314 in the 2004 census.

History 
During the Syrian Civil War, Al Abbas was occupied by ISIS until the Syrian Arab Army captured the town in 2017.

References 

Populated places in Deir ez-Zor Governorate
Populated places on the Euphrates River